Wells of Life (WOL) is a 501(c)(3) Christian non-profit organization whose goal is to provide rural Ugandans access to safe, clean water through the installation of sustainable borehole water wells and teaching the local community about sustainable hygiene and water supply. It was founded in 2008 and has funded over 820 wells  primarily in the Mityana , Kassanda and Mubende regions of Uganda, all of which collectively serve more than 820,000 people. It is based in Irvine, California, and is currently building headquarters in Mubende, Uganda. In 2018, Wells of Life founded its Irish counterpart, Wells of Life Ireland.

History 
Wells of Life was founded November 28, 2008, by Nick Jordan, a Laguna Beach real estate agent and Ireland native who recognized the dire need for clean water while in Uganda. Its first wells were built in 2009. Wells of Life was granted 501(c)(3) status by the Internal Revenue Service in 2012.

In 2015, Wells of Life was recognized as Forge54's sponsored non-profit of the year, receiving $574,725 in services from nearly 100 volunteers during Forge54's third annual 54-hour weekend volunteering marathon.

In August 2016, Wells of Life began partnering with the Christian East Africa Economic Development Trust (CEED). The organizations were introduced by two Grove City College students interning at CEED. CEED employs the local Ugandans who drill and maintain the wells that Wells of Life funds.

On March 12, 2018, the Kingdom of Buganda signed a memorandum of understanding with Wells of Life, affirming their common goal of bringing clean water to the Buluuli, Kooki, and Mawogola counties of Uganda, where water concerns are most severe.

Also in March, Wells of Life purchased land in the Mubende region of Uganda to build a 12,000-square foot, $1 million headquarters facility. The headquarters will include staff and guest accommodations, business offices, and well-drilling and maintenance warehouses and training facilities. 

In May 2018, Wells of Life founded its Irish counterpart, Wells of Life Ireland, based in Navan in the county of Meath.

In 2019, we launched a project called Operation Restoration! This project was to help save the wells that began to act as non-functioning wells. Wells of life works to not only drill new wells, but to restore forgotten non-functioning wells drilled by previous organizations. There was many communities in Uganda that were lacking clean water in result of a non-functioning well. The only difference between a new well and a restored non-functioning well is timing. A repaired well has sometimes been non-functioning for several years. The result is the same, 1,000 people now have access to safe water! 

In April 2020, In response to the Corona Virus, Wells of Life donated 10,000 bars of soap to both local and national leadership in Uganda. When this soap is dissolved in water, the components of the soap forms circular "micelles" exposing all of the water-loving ends outward. The Corona Virus is coated with lipids and proteins, the hydrophilic (water-loving) component of soap acts to dissolve the lipids and break down the proteins, both of which actions help prevent the virus from entering the cells on the skin.

Partnerships 
Wells of Life has a partnership with the Honorable Charles Peter Mayiga, the Prime Minister of Buganda. During their March 2018 meeting, part of which aired on NTVUganda, Jordan and Mayiga discussed the consequences of water inaccess in Uganda, as well as Jordan's goal of helping all of Uganda gain access to clean drinking water by 2038.

Wells of Life partners with the Christian East Africa Economic Development Trust (CEED) to drills its wells. CEED is a US-based non-governmental organization that has employed local Ugandans to drill and repair wells for more than 20 years. CEED is responsible for designing the sustainable well that Wells of Life places in villages.

In 2018, Austin Hedges, catcher for the San Diego Padres and a Wells of Life Ambassador, teamed up with Adam Wainright's Big League Impact to fundraise for Wells of Life. Hedges asked donors to pledge an amount per Padres win in the 2018 season, and pledged to match their donations up to $12,000.

In 2020, Wells of Life partnered with She for She. This is a Ugandan-based social enterprise, that provides sustainable menstrual kits to girls in rural areas. Wells of Life will provide each and every girl with her own kit that will contain everything required for her menstrual hygiene. Not only will this ensure that our girls no longer miss several days of school each month, but they will come to know that their hopes and dreams matter to Wells of Life. Along with providing female students with Menstrual Kits, Wells of Life will also host an education session with male students to help reduce bullying girls about their natural cycle. We are excited to be able to provide girls with the same quality of education as boys.

Programs

WE DRILL WELLS 
As of 2021, Wells of Life has funded and drilled 820 wells in Uganda, primarily in the Mityana, Kassanda and Mubende regions. New wells can be the difference between life and death. Safe access to clean water creates sustainable communities. When you give clean water you give time, opportunity, education, and empowerment. When a community receives clean water, they are given the resources of health, hygiene, and time to create a more sustainable society.  Each  New well costs $8,000, which includes drilling, maintenance, and repair costs.  

The wells are personalized with plaques containing information about the well's donor. Notable well donors include Pedego Electric Bikes and Irish tenor Anthony Kearns. Local Eagle Scouts, as well as students from Mission Basilica School, Mater Dei High School, and Servite High School have also donated wells. A well was donated to mark the engagement of actor Miles Teller and model Keleigh Sperry, who are both Wells of Life ambassadors. Other wells have been dedicated to honor individuals posthumously: A 2018 well was dedicated to the late Reverend Billy Graham; Kearns donated a well in 2015 in honor of victims of the September 11 attacks; and a well in 2015 was dedicated to the six Irish students who died in a balcony collapse in Berkeley, California, that year.

OPERATION RESTORATION 
The only difference between a new well and a restored non-functional well is timing. Both communities suffer from lack of safe water. The receivers of a new well receive clean water for the first time. A repaired well has sometimes been non-functional for several years. Imagine once having access to clean water and then losing it because of a malfunctioning mechanical part. The result is the same: 1,000 people now have access to safe water.

Wells of Life works to not only drill new wells, but to restore forgotten non-functioning wells drilled by previous organizations. Each Restoration well cost $4,000, which includes, drilling, maintenance, and repair costs.

HEALTHY VILLAGE 
Healthy Village Program is also known as WASH. WASH is an acronym that stands for the interrelated areas of Water, Sanitation and Hygiene.

Clean water, sanitation, and good hygiene practices are essential for survival. However, in rural Uganda, these elements of life are still not at hand’s reach for many children and families. Access to water, sanitation, and hygiene remain one of the biggest challenges in villages, schools, and health centers throughout the country.

We realized that while providing clean water we were performing life-saving and life-altering services, but there was still more we could do for our friend in rural Uganda. So, in 2019 we piloted our WASH program that we have since renamed our Healthy Village Program.

Our solution is to provide education and resources that encourage healthy sanitation and hygienic practices.  The implementation of the Healthy Village Program takes approximately 9 months to a full year in order to educate the community on how to build and use latrines, ending Open Defecation and thus eliminating fecal contamination.

The cost of our Healthy Village Program is $8,000.

Water Warriors
Water Warriors are a passionate and committed community of monthly givers on a mission to create sustainable communities through clean water.  These people, from all over the world, are giving what they can to transform the lives of those in need! Just $50 per month can transform the lives of 100 children a year! Like any monthly subscription, sign up is easy, and payments are automatic because doing good should be easy work. To sign up for the Water Warriors Program, visit the Wells of Life website and click,

Run4Water
Run4Water is the biggest fundraising event of the year. This event brings together schools, churches, businesses & families and allows everyone to play a part of the progression to bringing clean water to the communities that need it the most. For the past six years, this event has brought clean water to over 150,000 people in rural Uganda. In 2021, Wells of Life was able to raise $223,000 and funded 54 Restoration Wells.

Financials 
Wells of Life, Inc. is a registered 501(c)(3) non-profit organization. We believe in transparency, ethical accounting, and donor stewardship.

Annual reports

External Sources 
 Official website

References

Water supply and sanitation in Uganda